Sophie Cottin  (22 March 1770 – 25 August 1807) was a French writer whose novels were popular in the 19th century, and were translated into several different languages.

Biography
Marie Sophie Ristaud (sometimes spelt Risteau) was born in March 1770 at Tonneins. She was not yet twenty when she married her first husband, Jean-Paul-Marie Cottin, a banker. She wrote several romantic and historical novels including Elizabeth; or, the Exiles of Siberia (Elisabeth ou les Exilés de Sibérie 1806), a "wildly romantic but irreproachably moral tale", according to Nuttall's Encyclopaedia. She also published Claire d'Albe (1799), Malvina (1801), Amélie de Mansfield (1803), Mathilde (1805), set in the crusades, and a prose-poem, La Prise de Jéricho.  Her writing became more important to her after her first husband died when she was in her early twenties. She went to live with a cousin and her three children at Champlan (Seine-et-Oise) but died at the age of 37 in Paris on 25 August 1807.

List of works 
 Claire d'Albe (1799)
 Malvina (1800)
 Amélie Mansfield (1802)
 English translation : Amelia Mansfield : a novel (1809)
 Mathilde (1805)
 Élisabeth ou Les exilés de Sibérie (1806)

References

Bibliography

External links
 
 
Introduction to Amélie Mansfield
Cottin's life and works (in French)

1770 births
1807 deaths
People from Lot-et-Garonne
French women novelists
Burials at Père Lachaise Cemetery
18th-century French women writers
18th-century letter writers